USS Scout is a name used more than once by the United States Navy, and may refer to:

 , a patrol boat in commission from 1917 to 1919
 , a patrol boat in commission in 1917
 , a minesweeper in commission from 1944 to 1947 and from 1951 to 1954.
 , a mine countermeasures ship in commission since 1990

References 

United States Navy ship names